Ivana Jelčić (born 16 March 1980) is a Croatian handball goalkeeper. She plays on the Croatian national team, and participated at the 2011 World Women's Handball Championship in Brazil and the 2012 Summer Olympics.

References

External links

1980 births
Living people
Croatian female handball players
Sportspeople from Mostar
Olympic handball players of Croatia
Handball players at the 2012 Summer Olympics
Mediterranean Games medalists in handball
Mediterranean Games bronze medalists for Croatia
Competitors at the 2005 Mediterranean Games
RK Podravka Koprivnica players
21st-century Croatian women